The list of shipwrecks in September 1828 includes all ships sunk, foundered, grounded, or otherwise lost during September 1828.

2 September

8 September

9 September

12 September

13 September

14 September

17 September

18 September

23 September

26 September

28 September

29 September

30 September

Unknown date

References

1828-09